Poix-de-Picardie is a railway station located in the commune of Poix-de-Picardie in the Somme department, France. The station is served by TER Normandie and TER Hauts-de-France trains from Amiens to Rouen.

The station
The station is used more frequently than most along the 139 km long line, where passenger use is light. According to the SNCF it averaged 243 passengers per operating day in 2003. It is no longer staffed; tickets are obtainable from a dispenser on platform 1.

On film
In 1968, the railway scenes for the film Le Cerveau by Gérard Oury starring André Bourvil, Jean-Paul Belmondo and David Niven were filmed on the line.

The SNCF also filmed an advertisement on passenger safety on the Poix viaduct in 2004. Mathieu Kassovitz directed.

See also
List of SNCF stations in Hauts-de-France

References

External links
 

Railway stations in Somme (department)